Norman Lockyer Island is located off the eastern coast of Ellesmere Island, and a part of the Qikiqtaaluk Region of the Canadian territory of Nunavut. Situated in Princess Marie Bay just in front of Franklin Pierce Bay,  WSW of Cape Prescott, north of Bache Peninsula, Norman Lockyer Island is within the Arctic Archipelago, a member of the Queen Elizabeth Islands.

History 
It is named in honor of the English scientist and astronomer Joseph Norman Lockyer.

In 1882, Norman Lockyer Island was the most northerly point reached by the relief vessel, the Neptune, trying to reach Adolphus Greely's Lady Franklin Expedition.

References

External links
 Norman Lockyer Island in the Atlas of Canada - Toporama; Natural Resources Canada

Islands of the Queen Elizabeth Islands
Islands of Baffin Bay
Uninhabited islands of Qikiqtaaluk Region